Beaten biscuits are a Southern food from the United States, dating from the 19th century. They differ from  regular American soft-dough  biscuits in that they are more like  hardtack. In New England they are called "sea biscuits", as they were staples aboard whaling ships. Beaten biscuits are also historically associated with Maryland cuisine.

Characteristics and preparation

The dough was originally made from flour, salt, sugar, lard, and cold water, and beaten with a hard object or against a hard surface. It is pricked with a fork prior to baking and cut smaller than a regular biscuit.

How long the biscuits are beaten varies from one recipe to the next, from "at least 15 minutes" to "30 to 45 minutes." The beating these biscuits undergo is severe: they are banged with a "rolling pin, hammer, or side of an axe"; or they are "pounded with a blunt instrument...[even] a tire iron will do...Granny used to beat 'em with a musket"; one book "instructs the cook to 'use boys to do it'"—that is, beat the biscuits vigorously "at least 200 times." Besides ensuring the proper texture for the biscuit, "this beating also serves to vent the cook's weekly accumulation of pent-up frustrations."

Uses
These biscuits were traditionally used in "ham biscuits", a traditional Southern canapé, where they are sliced horizontally and spread with butter, jelly, mustard and filled with pieces of country ham, or used to sop up gravy or syrup.  They are sometimes considered "Sunday biscuits" and can be stored for several months in an airtight container. Beaten biscuits were once so popular that special machines, called biscuits brakes, were manufactured to knead the dough in home kitchens. A biscuit brake typically consists of a pair of steel rollers geared together and operated by a crank, mounted on a small table with a marble top and cast iron legs.

Due to the amount of work required to make them, beaten biscuits are no longer popular. Ham biscuits are still widely found in the United States but are made with standard biscuits or dinner rolls.

See also

 List of American breads
 List of regional dishes of the United States
 Annie Fisher's "old Missouri style"

References

American breads
Cuisine of the Southern United States
Quick breads
Soul food
New England cuisine